The Triglav Bistrica (also simply known as the Bistrica) is a stream that flows through the glacial Vrata Valley southwest of Mojstrana, Slovenia. Its source is below the north face of Mount Triglav in the blind Bukovlje Valley, and it flows past the Aljaž Lodge. In addition to several intermittent tributaries with a flashy character, it also has three constant tributaries, all of them flowing from valleys below the east slope of Mount Škrlatica: Dry Creek, Red Creek, and Peričnik Creek. The Triglav Bistrica empties into the Sava Dolinka at Mojstrana. It falls  during its approximately  course.

References

External links

The Triglav Bistrica at Geopedia

Rivers of Upper Carniola
Rivers of the Julian Alps
Sava